Shaolin Vs. Evil Dead (Shao Lin jiang shi) is a kung fu vampire movie starring Gordon Liu. The movie title itself exploits the film Evil Dead, however, there is actually no relationship between two films. The film also heavily references the style of Mr. Vampire, though it has a unique plot.

The film ends abruptly, without resolution, because of a planned sequel, which is previewed in the end credits. The funding for the sequel was approved in 2005, and the second half of the film, Shaolin Vs. Dead: Ultimate Power was released the same year.

Cast
Gordon Liu as "Pak"
Fan Siu-Wong as "Hak/Black"
Jacky Woo
Shannon Yoh

Other credits
Executive producer: Sharon Yang Pan Pan
Special effects makeup: Kwok Lai Lai
Visual effects supervisor: Alan Chow

References

External links
 
 Hong Kong Movie Database

2004 films
Hong Kong martial arts films
Kung fu films
2000s action horror films
Vampires in film
2000s Hong Kong films